Robert Miller (born July 1943), is a Canadian businessman and philanthropist who founded Future Electronics in 1968, and built it into the world's third-largest electronics distributor. 

Miller is also a supporter of the Alcor Life Extension Foundation and cryonics research, and he intends to be cryopreserved himself.

Early life
Miller was born in July 1943. Miller is a graduate of Rider University. He worked at a snackbar and as a DJ to pay for college.

Personal life
Miller is divorced, with two children, and lives in Montreal, Canada.

Allegations of sexual assault
In 2023, CBC/Radio Canada published a story alleging that Miller had been investigated several times for having paid sexual contacts with minors. Miller's lawyers have denied all allegations. 

Following the broadcast on February 2, 2023 on the Radio Canada investigative programs Enquête and The Fifth Estate on CBC Television, Miller stepped down as chairman, president and CEO of Future Electronics.

References

Living people
1943 births
Cryonicists
Canadian billionaires
Rider University alumni
Businesspeople from Montreal
Businesspeople in electronics